An invest in meteorology (short for investigative area, alternatively written INVEST) is a designated area of disturbed weather that is being monitored for potential tropical cyclone development. Invests are designated by three separate United States forecast centers: the National Hurricane Center, the Central Pacific Hurricane Center, and the Joint Typhoon Warning Center.

Invests (also called areas of interest) are designated by three separate forecast centers located in the United States: the National Hurricane Center in Miami, Florida, overseeing the North Atlantic and North Eastern Pacific basins (east of the 140°W meridian); the Central Pacific Hurricane Center in Honolulu, Hawaii, monitoring the North Central Pacific basin (between the International Date Line and the 140°W meridian); and the military Joint Typhoon Warning Center in Pearl Harbor, Hawaii (formerly located in the island of Guam), serving U.S. government interests elsewhere (i.e. the North Western Pacific basin west of the International Date Line). The designation of a system as an invest does not necessarily correspond to any particular likelihood of development of the system into a tropical cyclone (tropical depression, tropical storm, or hurricane/typhoon).

Designation

Invests are numbered from 90 to 99, followed by a suffix letter "L" in the North Atlantic basin, "E" and "C" in the Eastern and Central Pacific basins (respectively), or "W" in the Western Pacific basin.

The Joint Typhoon Warning Center also issues unofficial warnings for U.S. government interests (predominantly military) in the Southern Hemisphere, designating tropical invests with the "S" suffix when they form west of 135°E (this spans the whole South Indian Ocean, including the South-Western Indian Ocean basin and the western half of the Australian-region basin), and the "P" suffix when they form east of 135°E (spans both the eastern half of the Australian region and the South Pacific basin). In addition, invests in the North Indian Ocean cyclone basin are also labelled by the JTWC, and are suffixed with "A" if they form in the Arabian Sea and with "B" if they form in the Bay of Bengal.

The Naval Research Laboratory's Marine Meteorology Division also uses the "Q" suffix to designate invests which form in the South Atlantic Ocean, even though it is not recognized as an official tropical cyclone basin by the World Meteorological Organization.

These suffix letters (with the usual exception of "L") are also used with the tropical cyclone numbers (TC numbers for short) assigned to tropical and subtropical depressions (and potential tropical cyclones) monitored by the NHC & CPHC (North Atlantic systems are usually designated by TC numbers without a suffix letter; the "L" is still used, however, by the NRL for this basin) and all tropical, subtropical, and potential tropical cyclones tracked by the JTWC.

Number rotation 
Numbers are rotated within the season and are re-used as necessary (the next invest after 99 would be numbered 90). In contrast, TC numbers start each year/season with 01 and run upwards, usually up to 30 in NHC and CPHC-monitored basins. The hard-coded limit imposed by the Automated Tropical Cyclone Forecasting System is 49. TC numbers assigned to proper cyclones (tropical, subtropical, and potential tropical) are not recycled until the following year/season. If the invest system develops into a (sub)tropical cyclone, it is reclassified as the next name/number on the list. This is a TC number if evolving into a depression or JTWC cyclone; or a name if evolving quickly into a tropical or subtropical storm, bypassing the depression stage). The NHC also numbers cyclones based on previous seasons.

References

External links
Navy/NRL Tropical Cyclone Page - Current tropical cyclones and INVESTS worldwide

Tropical cyclone meteorology